Shan Fadh Bullock (John William, 17 May 1865 – 27 February 1935) was an Irish writer. He was born at Inisherk in Fermanagh and died in Surrey. He attended Farra School in County Westmeath, he failed the Dublin University entrance exams and moved to London. He served on secretariat of Irish Home Rule Convention.

Bullock's works include 14 novels set in Ulster and he was admired by J.M. Barrie and Thomas Hardy.

Works 
The awkward squads and other stories (London : Cassell, 1893.)
By Thrasna River (London : Ward, Lock & Bowden, 1895.)
Ring o' rushes (London ; New York : Ward, Lock, 1896.)
The charmer : a seaside comedy (London : J. Bowden, 1897.)
The Barrys  (London ; New York : Harper & Brothers, 1899.)
Irish Pastorals (London : Grant Richards, 1901.)
The Squireen (London : Methuen, 1903)
Robert Thorne (London : T. Werner Laurie 1907?)
Master John (London : Laurie, 1909?)
Thomas Andrews, shipbuilder (Dublin ; and London : Maunsel and company, ltd, 1912.)
Mors et vita (London : T. Werner Laurie, 1923)
The Loughsiders (London : G.G. Harrap & co. ltd., 1924.)
Gleanings (Sutton, Surrey : William Pile, 1926?)
After sixty years (London : Sampson Low, Marston, 1931?)

References

External links
 
 
 Shan Bullock Manuscript Collection at Queen's University Belfast
 

1865 births
1935 deaths
People from County Fermanagh
Male novelists from Northern Ireland
19th-century Irish novelists
20th-century novelists from Northern Ireland
20th-century British male writers